Mac OS Inuit, also called Mac OS Inuktitut or InuitSCII, is an 8-bit, single byte, extended ASCII character encoding supporting the variant of Canadian Aboriginal syllabics used by the Inuktitut language. It was designed by Doug Hitch for the government of the Northwest Territories, and adopted by Michael Everson for his fonts. 

Mac OS Inuit is used by the Inuktitut localisation of the classic Mac OS, which was overseen by the Baffin Bay Divisional Board of Education with support from Everson Gunn Teoranta and authorised by Apple, although it did not ship with Apple hardware.

Layout 
Each character is shown with its equivalent Unicode code point. Only the second half of the table (code points 128–255) is shown, the first half (code points 0–127) being the same as ASCII.

References

Character sets
Inuit
Inuit